Timeblazers is a Canadian television series. It aired on YTV and Discovery Kids. It features Sam and Jen, two young people who illustrate the origin of present-day customs and technologies as well as discuss notable people through some method of time travel. Sam and Jen generally do this after a preteen asks a question regarding the origins of something. They travel into the past to explain the happenings and wonders of the old times.

Originally, Shakira, who was portrayed by Jasmine Richards was the preteen who generally originated the questions; however, in later episodes another preteen named Alex replaced her. Alex was portrayed by Stephen Joffe.

After the series ended, reruns continued to air on The Hub until June 24, 2011. 40 episodes were produced between 2003 and 2005.

Cast
 Mike Ackerman - Sam
 Heidi Leigh - Jen 
 Jasmine Richards - Shakira (season 1)
 Stephen Joffe- Alex (seasons 2 and 3)

Episodes

Season 1
 The Keys to the Kingdom
 Planes, Trains & Stagecoaches
 The Great Stink
 The Mother of All Inventions
 The Emperor's Old Clothes
 The Good, the Bad and the Bread
 A Feast Fit for a King
 Get Ready to Rumble!
 Leech a Cold, Bleed a Fever
 Gold!
 Off with His Head!
 Message in a Bottle
 Rumbling and Romance

Season 2
 Kid Jobs
 Home on the Range
 Lost in the Stars
 Schools
 Hot Chocolate
 Romans

Season 3
 Dangerous Women
 The Flat Earth Society
 Fun and Games
 History's Biggest Mistakes
 Bikes
 Can You Dig It?
 Flight
 Dark Ages
 A Short History of Time
 A Soldier's Life
 Explorers
 Tyrants
 Who Discovered America?

References

External links

Discovery Kids original programming
2000s Canadian children's television series
2003 Canadian television series debuts
2005 Canadian television series endings
Canadian children's education television series
Canadian time travel television series
English-language television shows
YTV (Canadian TV channel) original programming
2000s Canadian time travel television series